The Cape Chronicle was a newspaper that operated from Cape Town in the Cape Colony, for a brief period from 1870 to 1871. It was edited by William Foster, who had previously edited the Cape Standard in the 1860s.

References

Defunct newspapers published in South Africa
Publications established in 1870
Publications disestablished in 1871
1870 establishments in the Cape Colony
1890 disestablishments in the Cape Colony